Javier Prado Valaguez (born February 19, 1957) is a Mexican retired Luchador, or professional wrestler, best known under the ring name Chamaco Valaguez (Spanish for "Kid Valaguez"). Valaquez also wrestle as the enmascarado (masked) character Platino, the original version until 1991 when someone else took over the character. Valaquez' two sons are also professional wrestlers working under the names Apolo Valaquez and Nosferatu. In early 2019 he was appointed president of the boxing and professional wrestling commission in Cuernavaca.

Professional wrestling career
Valaguez made his professional wrestling debut on February 8, 1976, wrestling as Chamaco Valaguez. By 1980 Valaguez became a regular for Empresa Mexicana de Lucha Libre (EMLL), Mexico's largest and oldest professional wrestling promotion. On June 12, 1980, Valaguez won his first championship, defeating Rodolfo Ruiz to win the Mexican National Lightweight Championship. Valaguez held the Lightweight title for close to 600 days, making numerous title defenses along the way. The title run really helped establish Valaquez as a promising wrestler, during his title run Valaguez used an elevated cradle neckbreaker move so frequently that it was named after him, being known as La Valagueza from then on. Valaguez defended the title on numerous occasions over the following year, until vacating it on July 26, 1984, when he won the NWA World Welterweight Championship from Mocho Cota. Valaguez' run with the NWA Welterweight title was as successful as his run with the Mexican National Welterweight title, holding it and defending it for 359 days in total. After winning the Middleweight title he vacated the Welterweight championship, making it the second title in a row he vacated because he won a higher ranking title. After 302 days with the title Valaguez was defeated by Gran Cochisse and lost the championship. In 1991 Valaguez adopted an enmascarado (masked) ring character called Platino, part of a trio called Los Metalicos, along with Oro and Bronce. Valaquez only played the part of Platino for under year before being replaced by a new Platino. Valaguez' schedule reduced greatly through the 1990s, but he remained active until at least 2005.

In recent years Valaguez' two sons have begun wrestling; one of his sons initially wrestled as "Chamaco Valaguez, Jr." but in 2007 he changed his ring character to the enmascarado Nosferatu and is now a part of Los Infernales. Valaguez' other son wrestles as Apolo Valaguez.

Post retirement
In early 2019 Valaguez was appointed the president of the Cuernavaca, Morelos professional wrestling and boxing commission, overseeing and enforcing the rules for all wrestling and boxing shows in the city.

Championships and accomplishments
Empresa Mexicana de Lucha Libre
Mexican National Lightweight Championship (1 time)
Mexican National Welterweight Championship (1 time)
NWA World Middleweight Championship (1 time)
NWA World Welterweight Championship (1 time)
Regional championships
Morelos Welterweight Championship (1 time)

Luchas de Apuestas record

Notes

References

1957 births
Living people
Mexican male professional wrestlers
Professional wrestlers from Morelos
People from Cuernavaca
Mexican National Welterweight Champions
20th-century professional wrestlers
21st-century professional wrestlers
NWA World Middleweight Champions
NWA World Welterweight Champions